The Richmond Vale Railway Museum operates a railway and museum located at the heritage-listed Richmond Main Colliery south of Kurri Kurri, New South Wales. The museum is a volunteer non-profit organization, formed in 1979 with the aim of preserving the Richmond Vale railway line and the mining heritage of J & A Brown and the Hunter Valley.

History 
After the closure of Richmond Main Power Station in 1976, Cessnock City Council acquired the abandoned Richmond Main Colliery together with  surrounding the buildings from Coal & Allied.

In 1979 the newly formed Richmond Vale Preservation Co-operative Society assumed the responsibility for the railway, leaving the development of Richmond Main Park and Mining Museum to be done independently.

Operations
The museum is opened on the first three Sundays of each month and every Sunday during school holidays, and the site consists of the following features:

Richmond Vale Office
Museum Display
Mining Equipment
Railway Locomotives and Rolling Stock
former passenger line from Richmond Main Colliery to Pelaw Main Colliery Line
Line extension to Weston station (planned)

Preservation

The museum also operates a small number of ex-industrial diesels, and owns a wide variety of ex-New South Wales Government Railways and ex-industrial rollingstock.

Ex-industrial diesels are:
 BHP 34 - built 1954, A.Goninan & Co (B/N 3/S1003) (Stored-Operational)
 BHP 42 (Static- privately owned)
 BHP 43 - built 1960, A.Goninan & Co (B/N 3456-10/60-007) (Static)
 BHP 53 - built 1963, A.Goninan & Co (B/N 9211-4/64-018) (Operational)
 BHP 54 - built 1965, A.Goninan & Co(B/N 3835-12/65-020) (Static)
 DR1 ex Commonwealth Railways - built 1954, Ruston & Hornsby (B/N 3279868) (Static)
 Planet Number 54 ex Maritime Services Board Coffs Harbour Jetty - Built 1955, F.C. Hibberd (B/N 3715) (Operational)
NSWGR Former steam operated now diesel powered 70T crane No. 1073, converted during use with NSWGR  - built 1928, Cravens (Operational)
 X215 - built Department of Railways New South Wales Chullora Railway Workshops 1968 (static)
 X217 - built Department of Railways New South Wales Chullora Railway Workshops 1968 (operational)

Rail Motor
A 1923 Cadillac motor car was converted in 1937–8 to run on rails and its body was altered to carry more passengers. It was then operated as a passenger carrying vehicle for J & A Brown & Abermain Seaham Collieries company officials throughout the Richmond Vale Railway system until 1949. It subsequently saw service with the Sydney Tramway Museum in the Royal National Park, from 1964 until 1972 and is now undergoing restoration at Richmond Vale Railway Museum.

2017 Fire
Following a fire on 13 September 2017, the museum was closed, with the following losses.:
 3 stainless steel passenger cars
 10 of 16 restored non-air coal hoppers and almost all non-restored wagons
 All of the unrestored general freight vehicles
 Approximately 2.5 kilometres of track
 Damage to number 1 bridge on the link line to Pelaw Main.
The museum reopened to limited rail operation on 4 March 2018 and is gradually restoring damaged track to trafficable condition, with shuttle train services available over restored track. Other elements of the museum's operations remain available on open days as before the fire.

References

Closed regional railway lines in New South Wales
Mining museums in Australia
Railway museums in New South Wales
Rail transport in the Hunter Region
Steam museums
Tourist railways in New South Wales